Lew Brice (October 26, 1893 – June 16, 1966) was an American actor, dancer and comedian.

Biography
He was born Louis Borach on October 26, 1893 in Manhattan, New York City, the brother of Fannie Brice. He was the youngest of four children born to Rose Stern, a Hungarian Jewish woman who emigrated to America at age ten; and  Alsatian immigrant Charles Borach. Charles and Rose were saloon owners and had four children, Philip (born 1887), Carrie (born 1889), Fania, and Louis.

Brice married actress Mae Clarke on February 26, 1928; the union later ended in divorce.

He died June 16, 1966 in Hollywood, California, aged 72.

Stage performances
 The Passing Show of 1913  (July – Sept 1913)
 The Passing Show of 1914  (June – Sept 1914) 
 Maid in America (Feb – May 1915) 
 Step This Way (May – Aug 1916) 
 Americana (July 1926 – Feb 1927) 
 Billy Rose's Crazy Quilt  (May – Jul 1931)

Film
 The Income Tax Collector (1923)  
 Partners Again (1926) Pazinsky
 Lew Tyler's Wives (1926) Buzzy Mandelbush 
 Happy Days (1929) Minstrel Show Performer
 The Window Cleaners (1930)
 Two Seconds (1932) uncredited reporter

External links

References

1893 births
1966 deaths
American male comedians
20th-century American comedians
American burlesque performers
American people of Hungarian-Jewish descent
Jewish American comedians
Vaudeville performers
20th-century American Jews